Perry Township is one of the twelve townships of Allen County, Ohio, United States. The 2010 census found 3,531 people in the unincorporated parts of the township, outside the city of Lima.

Geography
Located in the southern part of the county, it borders the following townships:
Bath Township - north
Jackson Township - northeast corner
Auglaize Township - east
Wayne Township, Auglaize County - southeast corner
Union Township, Auglaize County - south
Duchouquet Township, Auglaize County - southwest
Shawnee Township - west
American Township - northwest corner

Part of the city of Lima, the county seat of Allen County, is located in northwestern Perry Township.

Name and history
It is one of twenty-six Perry Townships statewide.

Perry Township was first settled in 1830 by one John Ridenour. The township was officially established in December 1833, and it was organized in the following April.

Government
The township is governed by a three-member board of trustees, who are elected in November of odd-numbered years to a four-year term beginning on the following January 1. Two are elected in the year after the presidential election and one is elected in the year before it. There is also an elected township fiscal officer, who serves a four-year term beginning on April 1 of the year after the election, which is held in November of the year before the presidential election. Vacancies in the fiscal officership or on the board of trustees are filled by the remaining trustees.

References

External links
Allen County website

Townships in Allen County, Ohio
1833 establishments in Ohio
Populated places established in 1833
Townships in Ohio